German submarine U-2328 was a Type XXIII U-boat of Nazi Germany's Kriegsmarine during World War II. She was ordered on 20 September 1943, and was laid down on 19 May 1944 at Deutsche Werft, Hamburg, as yard number 482. She was launched on 7 August 1944 and commissioned under the command of Oberleutnant zur See Hans-Ullrich Scholle on 25 August 1944.

Design
Like all Type XXIII U-boats, U-2328 had a displacement of  when at the surface and  while submerged. The submarine was powered by one MWM six-cylinder RS134S diesel engine providing , one AEG GU4463-8 double-acting electric motor electric motor providing , and one BBC silent running CCR188 electric motor providing .

U-2328 was fitted with two  torpedo tubes in the bow. She could carry two preloaded torpedoes. The complement was 14–18 men. This class of U-boat did not carry a deck gun.

Service history
On 9 May 1945, U-2328 surrendered at Bergen, Norway. She was later transferred to Loch Ryan, Scotland on 30 May 1945. Of the 156 U-boats that eventually surrendered to the Allied forces at the end of the war, U-2328 was one of 116 selected to take part in Operation Deadlight. U-2328 was towed out to be sunk on 27 November 1945, but she would become one of 55 other boats that didn't make it to the scuttling area because she started taking on water, U-2328 sank while in tow.

See also
 Battle of the Atlantic

References

Bibliography

External links

U-boats commissioned in 1944
World War II submarines of Germany
1944 ships
Type XXIII submarines
Ships built in Hamburg
Operation Deadlight
World War II shipwrecks in the Atlantic Ocean
Maritime incidents in November 1945